West Melbourne is an inner-city suburb in Melbourne, Victoria, Australia,  north-west of the Melbourne central business district, located within the City of Melbourne local government area.

Located adjacent to the CBD, West Melbourne is bounded by Victoria Street and the Sunbury/Werribee railway lines in the north, Footscray Road, the Moonee Ponds Creek; and by La Trobe Street in the south. Peel Street and the Flagstaff Gardens help form the eastern boundary, with the western boundary defined by the Maribyrnong River and Coode Island.

Being originally largely an industrial area, a significant portion of West Melbourne is occupied by the Port of Melbourne, the Dynon Railway Yards and the Melbourne Markets. These include the Wholesale Fruit and Vegetable and Fish Markets, as well as the National Flower Centre. It also contains an increasing number of residential and commercial properties, consisting of a mixture of Victorian single and double storey terrace houses and converted warehouses at the north-west corner of the Melbourne CBD. It is also adjacent to the Queen Victoria Market, located on the east of Peel Street and to the south of Victoria Street.

History

West Melbourne Post Office opened on 1 March 1937 and was replaced by the Queen Vic Market Newsagency office in 1990, which closed in 1996.

Population

The most common countries of birth were China 7.4%, India 4.9%, South Korea 4.5%, Malaysia 3.7% and New Zealand 2.6%. 45.4% of people only spoke English at home. Other languages spoken at home included Mandarin 10.0%, Korean 4.3%, Cantonese 3.5% and Spanish 2.0%. The most common response for religion was No Religion at 44.8%.

Transport

The North Melbourne railway station is actually located in West Melbourne, opposite the Railway Hotel on Ireland Street.

220 Sunshine - Gardenvale passes along Dudley Street operated by Kinetic Melbourne
401 North Melbourne – University of Melbourne via Royal Melbourne Hospital, University of Melbourne (Monday to Friday), operated by Transit Systems Victoria

A number of tram routes run along the periphery of the suburb, along Victoria Street:
Route 30: St Vincent's Plaza – Docklands
Route 57: West Maribyrnong – Flinders Street station
Route 58: Toorak – West Coburg
City Circle

Culture

Churches

 West Melbourne Baptist
 St Mary Star of the Sea, West Melbourne Catholic
 St James Old Cathedral (Melbourne's oldest cathedral, built in 1842)
 St Mary's Anglican

Hotels
 Carron Tavern, Spencer Street
 McMahons Hotel (Moomba Hotel, formerly North West Hotel), Spencer Street
 Railway Hotel, Ireland Street
 Royal Mail Hotel (formerly Maitz), Spencer Street
 Royal Standard Hotel, William Street
 Hotel Spencer, Spencer Street
 Three Crowns Hotel, Victoria Street

Restaurants

 Sassy.x Restaurant & Bar
 Sarim's Cafe'
 Citrus Mint
 Kathmandu Cottage
 Warung Agus
 Le Taj
 Wild East
 Amiconi
 Fraus
 Tandoori Dhaba

Entertainment venues
 Festival Hall
 Witches in Britches
 The Looney Bin

Parks and gardens
 Flagstaff Gardens
 The Triangle Park (bounded by King Street, Chetwynd Street, Eades Place)
 The Pocket Park (bounded by William, Howard and Rosslyn Streets)

Localities

North of the railway lines
The area bounded by Railway Parade and Spencer Street has undergone significant change since 2000. While the region has always been mixed industry and residential, the industrial flavour of the area has diminished rapidly, as West Melbourne's population increases. In Dryburgh, Laurens, Ireland, Stanley and Adderley Streets, the majority of the warehouses have been converted to townhouse developments. The development nearby of the Docklands has had a significant impact on the perceived prestige of the area, and it is rapidly losing its status as one of the most affordable precincts with such proximity to the CBD.

Shopping
West Melbourne lays claim to the southern side of Victoria Street, meaning that a small range of restaurants and shops lie within its boundaries. Otherwise it has no shopping area of its own. However the Direct Factory Outlet development on Spencer Street in the CBD, and Errol Street, North Melbourne are just outside the boundary of West Melbourne.

Coode Island

Coode Island is a locality in West Melbourne's industrial zone. It is unusual in that although it is a locality of West Melbourne, with the creation of Melbourne Docklands and the Bolte Bridge, the area has become completely disconnected from the main area of the suburb.

It is the site of Victoria's major petrochemical storage facility. The area is named after engineer John Coode and retains the "Island" name, despite no longer being an island.

Gallery

References

External links
 Local history of West Melbourne
 http://www.melbourne.vic.gov.au/info.cfm?top=66&pa=779&pg=1386

Suburbs of Melbourne
Suburbs of the City of Melbourne (LGA)